Jules-André Peugeot (June 11, 1893 – August 2, 1914) was the first French soldier to die in World War I. He died one day before war was formally declared on France by Germany, in the same skirmish in which Albert Mayer became the first German soldier to die.

Early life 
Before being called up for compulsory military service in 1913, Jules Andre Peugeot was a teacher.

Death 

On mid morning on August 2, 1914, a German cavalry patrol led by Leutnant Albert Mayer patrolled into France before war had been officially declared. Upon crossing into French territory, Mayer slashed a French sentry with his saber before going deeper into France.

Around 9:30, Peugeot and his fellow soldiers were eating breakfast in a billet house owned by a certain Louis Doucourt. Doucourt's daughter, Adrienne, came in and told the soldiers that a German patrol had entered the town, at which Peugeot and his comrades arose from breakfast to meet them. At 9:59, Peugeot yelled at Mayer and his patrol to stop, as they were under arrest, but Mayer pulled out a pistol and shot Peugeot in the shoulder. Peugeot stumbled and shot his pistol, missing Mayer, but Peugeot's comrades returned fire, hitting Mayer in the stomach and head, killing him. Peugeot went back to the billet house where, at 10:37 am, he died on the steps of the house.

Memorial 
On the seventh anniversary of Peugeot's death, the French government erected a monument on the Alsatian border to commemorate the place where he died.

See also 
Albert Mayer (soldier), the first soldier and first Imperial German Army soldier killed, 1914
John Parr, the first British Army soldier killed, 1914
Thomas Enright, one of the first three American Army soldiers killed, 1917
Merle Hay,  one of the first three American Army soldiers killed, 1917
James Bethel Gresham, one of the first three American Army soldiers killed, 1917
George Edwin Ellison, the last British Army soldier killed in World War I, at 9:30 a.m. 11 November
Augustin Trébuchon, last French soldier killed, at 10:45 a.m. 11 November
George Lawrence Price, last Commonwealth soldier killed in World War I, 10:58 a.m. 11 November.
Henry Gunther, last soldier killed in World War I, at 10:59 a.m. 11 November.

References

External links 
 

1890s births
1914 deaths
French military personnel killed in World War I
People from Doubs